Gündolaması is a village in the Düzce District of Düzce Province in Turkey. Its population is 442 (2022).

References

Villages in Düzce District